Rodolfo Carbone (1928 – May 25, 2008) was a Brazilian football (soccer) player in the striker role.

He played for Corinthians in 231 games between 1951 and 1957, and scored 135 goals.

In 1951, the team composed of Carbone, Cláudio, Luisinho, Baltasar and Mário marked 103 goals in thirty matches of the São Paulo Championship, registering an average of 3,43 per game. Carbone was the top goal scorer of the competition with 30 goals.

Brazilian footballers
Sport Club Corinthians Paulista players
Brazilian people of Italian descent
1928 births
2008 deaths
Association football forwards